In mathematics, the oscillator representation is a projective unitary representation of the symplectic group, first investigated by Irving Segal, David Shale, and André Weil. A natural extension of the representation leads to a semigroup of contraction operators, introduced as the oscillator semigroup by Roger Howe in 1988. The semigroup had previously been studied by other mathematicians and physicists, most notably Felix Berezin in the 1960s.  The simplest example in one dimension is given by SU(1,1). It acts as Möbius transformations on the extended complex plane, leaving the unit circle invariant. In that case the oscillator representation is a unitary representation of a double cover of SU(1,1) and the oscillator semigroup corresponds to a representation by contraction operators of the semigroup in SL(2,C) corresponding to Möbius transformations that take the unit disk into itself.

The contraction operators, determined only up to a sign, have kernels that are Gaussian functions. On an infinitesimal level the semigroup is described by a cone in the Lie algebra of SU(1,1) that can be identified with a light cone. The same framework generalizes to the symplectic group in higher dimensions, including its analogue in infinite dimensions. This article explains the theory for SU(1,1) in detail and summarizes how the theory can be extended.

Historical overview
The mathematical formulation of quantum mechanics by Werner Heisenberg and Erwin Schrödinger was originally in terms of unbounded self-adjoint operators on a Hilbert space. The fundamental operators corresponding to position and momentum satisfy the Heisenberg commutation relations.  Quadratic polynomials in these operators, which include the harmonic oscillator, are also closed under taking commutators.

A large amount of operator theory was developed in the 1920s and 1930s to provide a rigorous foundation for quantum mechanics. Part of the theory was formulated in terms of unitary groups of operators, largely through the contributions of Hermann Weyl, Marshall Stone and John von Neumann. In turn these results in mathematical physics were subsumed within mathematical analysis, starting with the 1933 lecture notes of Norbert Wiener, who used the heat kernel for the harmonic oscillator to derive the properties of the Fourier transform.

The uniqueness of the Heisenberg commutation relations, as formulated in the Stone–von Neumann theorem, was later interpreted within group representation theory, in particular the theory of induced representations initiated by George Mackey. The quadratic operators were understood in terms of a projective unitary representation of the group SU(1,1) and its Lie algebra. Irving Segal and David Shale generalized this construction to the symplectic group in finite and infinite dimensions—in physics, this is often referred to as bosonic quantization: it is constructed as the symmetric algebra of an infinite-dimensional space. Segal and Shale have also treated the case of fermionic quantization, which is constructed as the exterior algebra of an infinite-dimensional Hilbert space. In the special case of conformal field theory in 1+1 dimensions, the two versions become equivalent via the so-called "boson-fermion correspondence." Not only does this apply in analysis where there are unitary operators between bosonic and fermionic Hilbert spaces, but also in the mathematical theory of vertex operator algebras. Vertex operators themselves originally arose in the late 1960s in theoretical physics, particularly in string theory.

André Weil later extended the construction to p-adic Lie groups, showing how the ideas could be applied in number theory, in particular to give a group theoretic explanation of theta functions and quadratic reciprocity. Several physicists and mathematicians observed the heat kernel operators corresponding to the harmonic oscillator were associated to a complexification of SU(1,1): this was not the whole of SL(2,C), but instead a complex semigroup defined by a natural geometric condition. The representation theory of this semigroup, and its generalizations in finite and infinite dimensions, has applications both in mathematics and theoretical physics.

Semigroups in SL(2,C)
The group:

is a subgroup of Gc = SL(2,C), the group of complex 2 × 2 matrices with determinant 1. If G1 = SL(2,R) then

This follows since the corresponding Möbius transformation is the Cayley transform which carries the upper half plane onto the unit disk and the real line onto the unit circle.

The group SL(2,R) is generated as an abstract group by

and the subgroup of lower triangular matrices

Indeed, the orbit of the vector

under the subgroup generated by these matrices is easily seen to be the whole of R2 and the stabilizer of v in G1 lies in inside this subgroup.

The Lie algebra  of SU(1,1) consists of matrices

The period 2 automorphism σ of Gc

with

has fixed point subgroup G since

Similarly the same formula defines a period two automorphism σ of the Lie algebra  of Gc, the complex matrices with trace zero.

Thus for −1 ≤ m, n ≤ 1

There is a direct sum decomposition

where  is the +1 eigenspace of σ and  the –1 eigenspace.

The matrices X in  have the form

Note that

The first is  By definition this condition is preserved under conjugation by G. Since G is connected it leaves the two components with x > 0 and x < 0 invariant. The second condition is 

The group Gc acts by Möbius transformations on the extended complex plane.

The semigroup can be described explicitly in terms of the cone C:

In fact the matrix X can be conjugated by an element of G to the matrix

with

Since the Möbius transformation corresponding to exp Y sends z to e−2yz, it follows that the right hand side lies in the semigroup. Conversely if g lies in H it carries the closed unit disk onto a smaller closed disk in its interior. Conjugating by an element of G, the smaller disk can be taken to have centre 0. But then for appropriate y, the element  carries D onto itself so lies in G.

A similar argument shows that the closure of H, also a semigroup, is given by

From the above statement on conjugacy, it follows that

where

If

then

since the latter is obtained by taking the transpose and conjugating by the diagonal matrix with entries ±1. Hence H also contains

which gives the inverse matrix if the original matrix lies in SU(1,1).

A further result on conjugacy follows by noting that every element of H must fix a point in D, which by conjugation with an element of G can be taken to be 0. Then the element of H has the form

The set of such lower triangular matrices forms a subsemigroup H0 of H.

Since

every matrix in H0 is conjugate to a diagonal matrix by a matrix M in H0.

Similarly every one-parameter semigroup S(t) in H fixes the same point in D so is conjugate by an element of G to a one-parameter semigroup in H0.

It follows that there is a matrix M in H0 such that

with S0(t) diagonal. Similarly there is a matrix  N in H0 such that

The semigroup H0 generates the subgroup L of complex lower triangular matrices with determinant 1 (given by the above formula with a ≠ 0). Its Lie algebra consists of matrices of the form

In particular the one parameter semigroup exp tZ lies in H0 for all t > 0 if and only if  and 

This follows from the criterion for H or directly from the formula

The exponential map is known not to be surjective in this case, even though it is surjective on the whole group L. This follows because the squaring operation is not surjective in H. Indeed, since the square of an element fixes 0 only if the original element fixes 0, it suffices to prove this in H0. Take α with |α| < 1 and

If a = α2 and

with

then the matrix

has no square root in H0. For a square root would have the form

On the other hand,

The closed semigroup  is maximal in SL(2,C): any larger semigroup must be the whole of SL(2,C).

Using computations motivated by theoretical physics,  introduced the semigroup , defined through a set of inequalities. In the key cases, either one disc contains the other or they are disjoint. In either case  and  generate an open neighbourhood of 1 and hence the whole of SL(2,C)

Later  gave another more direct way to prove maximality by first showing that there is a g in S sending D onto the disk Dc, |z| > 1. In fact if  then there is a small disk D1 in D such that xD1 lies in Dc. Then for some h in H, D1 = hD. Similarly yxD1 = Dc for some y in H. So g = yxh lies in S and sends D onto Dc. It follows that g2 fixes the unit disc D so lies in SU(1,1). So g−1 lies in S. If t lies in H then tgD contains gD. Hence  So t−1 lies in S and therefore S contains an open neighbourhood of 1. Hence S = SL(2,C).

Exactly the same argument works for Möbius transformations on Rn and the open semigroup taking the closed unit sphere ||x|| ≤ 1 into the open unit sphere ||x|| < 1. The closure is a maximal proper semigroup in the group of all Möbius transformations. When n = 1, the closure corresponds to Möbius transformations of the real line taking the closed interval [–1,1] into itself.

The semigroup H and its closure have a further piece of structure inherited from G, namely inversion on G extends to an antiautomorphism of H and its closure, which fixes the elements in exp C and its closure. For

the antiautomorphism is given by

and extends to an antiautomorphism of SL(2,C).

Similarly the antiautomorphism

leaves G1 invariant and fixes the elements in exp C1 and its closure, so it has analogous properties for the semigroup in G1.

Commutation relations of Heisenberg and Weyl

There operators satisfy the Heisenberg commutation relation

Both P and Q are self-adjoint for the inner product on  inherited from L2(R).

By definition

It is immediate from the definition that the one parameter groups U and V satisfy the Weyl commutation relation

The realization of U and V on L2(R) is called the Schrödinger representation.

Fourier transform

It defines a continuous map of  into itself for its natural topology.

Contour integration shows that the function

is its own Fourier transform.

On the other hand, integrating by parts or differentiating under the integral,

It follows that the operator on  defined by

commutes with both  Q (and P). On the other hand,

and since

and hence

This implies the Fourier inversion formula:

and shows that the Fourier transform is an isomorphism of  onto itself.

By Fubini's theorem

When combined with the inversion formula this implies that the Fourier transform preserves the inner product

so defines an isometry of  onto itself.

By density it extends to a unitary operator on L2(R), as asserted by Plancherel's theorem.

Stone–von Neumann theorem

Suppose U(s) and V(t) are one parameter unitary groups on a Hilbert space  satisfying the Weyl commutation relations

For  let

Then

where

Indeed, if fds and gdt define probability measures with compact support, then the smeared operators

satisfy

and converge in the strong operator topology to the identity operator if the supports of the measures decrease to 0.

Since U(f)V(g) has the form T(F), non-degeneracy follows.

When  is the Schrödinger representation on L2(R), the operator T(F) is given by

It follows from this formula that U and V jointly act irreducibly on the Schrödinger representation since this is true for the operators given by kernels that are Schwartz functions. A concrete description is provided by Linear canonical transformations.

But all such representations are on an orthogonal direct sum of copies of L2(R) with the action on each copy as above. This is a straightforward generalisation of the elementary fact that the representations of the N × N matrices are on direct sums of the standard representation on CN. The proof using matrix units works equally well in infinite dimensions.
 
The one parameter unitary groups U and V leave each component invariant, inducing the standard action on the Schrödinger representation.

In particular this implies the Stone–von Neumann theorem: the Schrödinger representation is the unique irreducible representation of the Weyl commutation relations on a Hilbert space.

Oscillator representation of SL(2,R)
Given U and V satisfying the Weyl commutation relations, define

Then

so that W defines a projective unitary representation of R2 with cocycle given by

where  and B is the symplectic form on R2 given by

By the Stone–von Neumann theorem, there is a unique irreducible representation corresponding to this cocycle.

It follows that if g is an automorphism of R2 preserving the form B, i.e. an element of SL(2,R), then there is a unitary π(g) on L2(R) satisfying the covariance relation

By Schur's lemma the unitary π(g) is unique up to multiplication by a scalar ζ with |ζ| = 1, so that π defines a projective unitary representation of SL(2,R).

This can be established directly using only the irreducibility of the Schrödinger representation. Irreducibility was a direct consequence of the fact the operators

with K a Schwartz function correspond exactly to operators given by kernels with Schwartz functions.

These are dense in the space of Hilbert–Schmidt operators, which, since it contains the finite rank operators, acts irreducibly.

The existence of π can be proved using only the irreducibility of the Schrödinger representation. The operators are unique up to a sign with

so that the 2-cocycle for the projective representation of SL(2,R) takes values ±1.

In fact the group SL(2,R) is generated by matrices of the form

 
and it can be verified directly that the following operators satisfy the covariance relations above:

The generators gi satisfy the following Bruhat relations, which uniquely specify the group SL(2,R):

It can be verified by direct calculation that these relations are satisfied up to a sign by the corresponding operators, which establishes that the cocycle takes values ±1.

There is a more conceptual explanation using an explicit construction of the metaplectic group as a double cover of SL(2,R). SL(2,R) acts by Möbius transformations on the upper half plane H. Moreover, if

then

The function

satisfies the 1-cocycle relation

For each g, the function m(g,z) is non-vanishing on H and therefore has two possible holomorphic square roots. The metaplectic group is defined as the group

By definition it is a double cover of SL(2,R) and is connected. Multiplication is given by

where

Thus for an element g of the metaplectic group there is a uniquely determined function m(g,z)1/2 satisfying the 1-cocycle relation.

If , then

lies in L2 and is called a coherent state.

These functions lie in a single orbit of SL(2,R) generated by

since for g in SL(2,R)

More specifically if g lies in Mp(2,R) then

Indeed, if this holds for g and h, it also holds for their product. On the other hand, the formula is easily checked if gt has the form gi and these are generators.

This defines an ordinary unitary representation of the metaplectic group.

The element (1,–1) acts as multiplication by –1 on L2(R), from which it follows that the cocycle on SL(2,R) takes only values ±1.

Maslov index

Given three non-zero vectors u, v, w in the plane, their Maslov index  is defined as the signature of the quadratic form on R3 defined by

Properties of the Maslov index:

 it depends on the one-dimensional subpaces spanned by the vectors
 it is invariant under SL(2,R)
 it is alternating in its arguments, i.e. its sign changes if two of the arguments are interchanged
 it vanishes if two of the subspaces coincide
 it takes the values –1, 0 and +1: if u and v satisfy B(u,v) = 1 and w = au + bv,  then the Maslov index is zero is if ab = 0 and is otherwise equal to minus the sign of ab

Picking a non-zero vector u0, it follows that the function

defines a 2-cocycle on SL(2,R) with values in the eighth roots of unity.

A modification of the 2-cocycle can be used to define a 2-cocycle with values in ±1 connected with the metaplectic cocycle.

In fact given non-zero vectors u, v in the plane, define f(u,v) to be

 i times the sign of B(u,v) if u and v are not proportional
 the sign of λ if u =   λv.

If

then

The representatives π(g) in the metaplectic representation can be chosen so that

where the 2-cocycle ω is given by

with

Holomorphic Fock space

Holomorphic Fock space (also known as the Segal–Bargmann space) is defined to be the vector space  of holomorphic functions f(z) on C with

finite. It has inner product

 is a Hilbert space with orthonormal basis

Moreover, the power series expansion of a holomorphic function in  gives its expansion with respect to this basis. Thus for z in C

so that evaluation at z is gives a continuous linear functional on  In fact

where

Thus in particular  is a reproducing kernel Hilbert space.

Then

so this gives a unitary representation of the Weyl commutation relations. Now

It follows that the representation  is irreducible.

If P is an orthogonal projection commuting with W(z), let f = PE0. Then

The only holomorphic function satisfying this condition is the constant function. So

with λ = 0 or 1. Since E0 is cyclic, it follows that P = 0 or I.

By the Stone–von Neumann theorem there is a unitary operator  from L2(R) onto , unique up to multiplication by a scalar, intertwining the two representations of the Weyl commutation relations. By Schur's lemma and the Gelfand–Naimark construction, the matrix coefficient of any vector determines the vector up to a scalar multiple. Since the matrix coefficients of F = E0 and f = H0 are equal, it follows that the unitary  is uniquely determined by the properties

and

Hence for f in L2(R)

so that

where

The operator  is called the Segal–Bargmann transform and B is called the Bargmann kernel.

Fock model

The metaplectic double cover of SU(1,1) can be constructed explicitly as pairs (g, γ) with

and

If g = g1g2, then

using the power series expansion of (1 + z)1/2 for |z| < 1.

The metaplectic representation is a unitary representation π(g, γ) of this group satisfying the covariance relations

where

Since  is a reproducing kernel Hilbert space, any bounded operator T on it corresponds to a kernel given by a power series of its two arguments. In fact if

The covariance relations and analyticity of the kernel imply that for S = π(g, γ),

for some constant C. Direct calculation shows that

leads to an ordinary representation of the double cover.

Coherent states can again be defined as the orbit of E0 under the metaplectic group.

For w complex, set

Then  if and only if |w| < 1. In particular F0 = 1 = E0. Moreover,

where

Since (Fw, E0) = 1, the matrix coefficient of the function E0 = 1 is given by

Disk model
The projective representation of SL(2,R) on L2(R) or on  break up as a direct sum of two irreducible representations, corresponding to even and odd functions of x or z. The two representations can be realized on Hilbert spaces of holomorphic functions on the unit disk; or, using the Cayley transform, on the upper half plane.

The even functions correspond to holomorphic functions F+ for which

is finite; and the odd functions to holomorphic functions F– for which

is finite. The polarized forms of these expressions define the inner products.

The action of the metaplectic group is given by

Irreducibility of these representations is established in a standard way. Each representation breaks up as a direct sum of one dimensional eigenspaces of the rotation group each of which is generated by a C∞ vector for the whole group. It follows that any closed invariant subspace is generated by the algebraic direct sum of eigenspaces it contains and that this sum is invariant under the infinitesimal action of the Lie algebra . On the other hand, that action is irreducible.

The isomorphism with even and odd functions in  can be proved using the Gelfand–Naimark construction since the matrix coefficients associated to 1 and z in the corresponding representations are proportional.  gave another method starting from the maps

from the even and odd parts to functions on the unit disk. These maps intertwine the actions of the metaplectic group given above and send zn to a multiple of wn. Stipulating that U± should be unitary determines the inner products on functions on the disk, which can expressed in the form above.

Although in these representations the operator L0 has positive spectrum—the feature that distinguishes the holomorphic discrete series representations of SU(1,1)—the representations do not lie in the discrete series of the metaplectic group. Indeed,  noted that the matrix coefficients are not square integrable, although their third power is.

Harmonic oscillator and Hermite functions
Consider the following subspace of L2(R):

The operators

act on  X is called the annihilation operator and Y the creation operator. They satisfy

Define the functions

We claim they are the eigenfunctions of the harmonic oscillator, D. To prove this we use the commutation relations above:

Next we have:

This is known for n = 0 and the commutation relation above yields

The nth Hermite function is defined by

pn is called the nth Hermite polynomial.

Let

Thus

Indeed, under the unitary isomorphism with holomorphic Fock space  can be identified with C[z], the space of polynomials in z, with

If a subspace invariant under A and A* contains a non-zero polynomial p(z), then, applying a power of A*, it contains a non-zero constant; applying then a power of A, it contains all zn.

Under the isomorphism Fn is sent to a multiple of zn and the operator D is given by

Let

so that

In the terminology of physics A, A* give a single boson and L0 is the energy operator. It is diagonalizable with eigenvalues 1/2, 1, 3/2, ...., each of multiplicity one. Such a representation is called a positive energy representation.

Moreover,

so that the Lie bracket with L0 defines a derivation of the Lie algebra spanned by A, A* and I. Adjoining L0 gives the semidirect product. The infinitesimal version of the Stone–von Neumann theorem states that the above representation on C[z] is the unique irreducible positive energy representation of this Lie algebra with L0 = A*A + 1/2. For A lowers energy and A* raises energy. So any lowest energy vector v is annihilated by A and the module is exhausted by the powers of A* applied to v. It is thus a non-zero quotient of C[z] and hence can be identified with it by irreducibility.

Let

so that

These operators satisfy:

and act by derivations on the Lie algebra spanned by A, A* and I.

They are the infinitesimal operators corresponding to the metaplectic representation of SU(1,1).

The functions Fn are defined by

The completeness of the Hermite functions follows from the fact that the Bargmann transform is unitary and carries the orthonormal basis en(z) of holomorphic Fock space onto the Hn(x).

The heat operator for the harmonic oscillator is the operator on L2(R) defined as the diagonal operator

It corresponds to the heat kernel given by Mehler's formula:

This follows from the formula

To prove this formula note that if s = σ2, then by Taylor's formula

Thus Fσ,x lies in holomorphic Fock space and

an inner product that can be computed directly.

 establishes Mehler's formula directly and uses a classical argument to prove that

tends to f in L2(R) as t decreases to 0. This shows the completeness of the Hermite functions and also, since

can be used to derive the properties of the Fourier transform.

There are other elementary methods for proving the completeness of the Hermite functions, for example using Fourier series.

Sobolev spaces

where

is the expansion of f in Hermite functions.

Thus

The Sobolev spaces are Hilbert spaces. Moreover, Hs and H–s are in duality under the pairing

For s ≥ 0,

for some positive constant Cs.

Indeed, such an inequality can be checked for creation and annihilation operators acting on Hermite functions Hn and this implies the general inequality.

It follows for arbitrary s by duality.

Consequently, for a quadratic polynomial R in P and Q

The Sobolev inequality holds for f in Hs with s > 1/2:

for any k ≥ 0.

Indeed, the result for general k follows from the case k = 0 applied to Qkf.

For k = 0 the Fourier inversion formula

implies

If s < t, the diagonal form of D, shows that the inclusion of Ht in Hs is compact (Rellich's lemma).

Standard arguments show that each Sobolev space is invariant under the operators W(z) and the metaplectic group. Indeed, it is enough to check invariance when g is sufficiently close to the identity. In that case

It follows that

If  then

where the derivatives lie in 

Similarly the partial derivatives of total degree k of U(s)V(t)f lie in Sobolev spaces of order s–k/2.

Consequently, a monomial in P and Q of order 2k applied to f lies in Hs–k and can be expressed as a linear combination of partial derivatives of U(s)V(t)f of degree ≤ 2k evaluated at 0.

Smooth vectors
The smooth vectors for the Weyl commutation relations are those u in L2(R) such that the map

is smooth. By the uniform boundedness theorem, this is equivalent to the requirement that each matrix coefficient (W(z)u,v) be smooth.

Sufficiency is clear. For necessity, smoothness implies that the partial derivatives of W(z)u lie in L2(R) and hence also Dku for all positive k.

It follows that smooth vectors are also smooth for the metaplectic group.

Moreover, a vector is in  if and only if it is a smooth vector for the rotation subgroup of SU(1,1).

Analytic vectors
If Π(t) is a one parameter unitary group and for f in 

then the vectors Π(f)ξ form a dense set of smooth vectors for Π.

In fact taking

the vectors v = Π(fε)ξ converge to ξ as ε decreases to 0 and

is an analytic function of t that extends to an entire function on C.

The vector is called an entire vector for Π.

The wave operator associated to the harmonic oscillator is defined by

The operator is diagonal with the Hermite functions Hn as eigenfunctions:

Since it commutes with D, it preserves the Sobolev spaces.

The analytic vectors constructed above can be  rewritten in terms of the Hermite semigroup as

The fact that v is an entire vector for Π is equivalent to the summability condition

for all r > 0.

Any such vector is also an entire vector for U(s)V(t), that is the map

defined on R2 extends to an analytic map on C2.

This reduces to the power series estimate

So these form a dense set of entire vectors for U(s)V(t); this can also be checked directly using Mehler's formula.

The spaces of smooth and entire vectors for U(s)V(t) are each by definition invariant under the action of the metaplectic group as well as the Hermite semigroup.

Let

be the analytic continuation of the operators W(x,y) from R2 to C2 such that

Then W leaves the space of entire vectors invariant and satisfies

Moreover, for g in SL(2,R)

using the natural action of SL(2,R) on C2.

Formally

Oscillator semigroup
There is a natural double cover of the Olshanski semigroup H, and its closure  that extends the double cover of SU(1,1) corresponding to the metaplectic group. It is given by pairs (g, γ) where g is an element of H or its closure

and γ is a square root of a.

Such a choice determines a unique branch of

for |z| < 1.

The unitary operators π(g) for g in SL(2,R) satisfy

for u in C2.

An element g of the complexification  SL(2,C) is said to implementable if there is a bounded operator T such that it and its adjoint leave the space of entire vectors for W invariant, both have dense images and satisfy the  covariance relations

for u in C2. The implementing operator T is uniquely determined up to multiplication by a non-zero scalar.

The implementable elements form a semigroup, containing SL(2,R). Since the representation has positive energy, the bounded compact self-adjoint operators

for t > 0 implement the group elements in exp C1.

It follows that all elements of the Olshanski semigroup and its closure are implemented.

Maximality of the Olshanki semigroup implies that no other elements of SL(2,C) are implemented. Indeed, otherwise every element of SL(2,C) would be implemented by a bounded operator, which would contradict the non-invertibility of the operators S0(t) for t > 0.

In the Schrödinger representation the operators S0(t) for t > 0 are given by Mehler's formula. They are contraction operators, positive and in every Schatten class. Moreover, they leave invariant each of the Sobolev spaces.

It can be seen directly in the Fock model that the implementing operators can be chosen so that they define an ordinary representation of the double cover of H constructed above. The corresponding semigroup of contraction operators is called the oscillator semigroup. The extended oscillator semigroup is obtained by taking the semidirect product with the operators W(u). These operators lie in every Schatten class and leave invariant the Sobolev spaces and the space of entire vectors for W.

The decomposition

corresponds at the operator level to the polar decomposition of bounded operators.

In particular it has the same spectrum consisting of simple eigenvalues.

In the Fock model, if the element g of the Olshanki semigroup H corresponds to the matrix

the corresponding operator is given by

where

and γ is a square root of a. Operators π(g,γ) for g in the semigroup H are exactly those that are Hilbert–Schmidt operators and correspond to kernels of the form

for which the complex symmetric matrix 
 

has operator norm strictly less than one.

Operators in the extended oscillator semigroup are given by similar expressions with additional linear terms in z and w appearing in the exponential.

In the disk model for  the two irreducible components of the metaplectic representation, the corresponding operators are given by

It is also possible to give an explicit formula for the contraction operators corresponding to g in H in the Schrödinger representation, It was by this formula that  introduced the oscillator semigroup as an explicit family of operators on L2(R).

In fact consider the Siegel upper half plane consisting of symmetric complex 2x2 matrices with positive definite real part:

and define the kernel

with corresponding operator

for f in L2(R).

Then direct computation gives

where

Moreover,

where

By Mehler's formula for 

with

The oscillator semigroup is obtained by taking only matrices with B ≠ 0. From the above, this condition is closed under composition.

A normalized operator can be defined by

The choice of a square root determines a double cover.

In this case SZ corresponds to the element

of the Olshankii semigroup H.

Moreover, SZ is a strict contraction:

It follows also that

Weyl calculus
For a function a(x,y) on R2 = C, let

So

where

Defining in general

the product of two such operators is given by the formula

where the twisted convolution or Moyal product is given by

The smoothing operators correspond to W(F) or ψ(a) with F or a Schwartz functions on R2. The corresponding operators T have kernels that are Schwartz functions. They carry each Sobolev space into the Schwartz functions. Moreover, every bounded operator on L2 (R) having this property has this form.

For the operators ψ(a) the Moyal product translates into the Weyl symbolic calculus. Indeed, if the Fourier transforms of a and b have compact support than

where

This follows because in this case b must extend to an entire function on C2 by the Paley-Wiener theorem.

This calculus can be extended to a broad class of symbols, but the simplest corresponds to convolution by a class of functions or distributions that all have the form T + S where T is a distribution of compact with singular support concentrated at 0 and where S is a Schwartz function. This class contains the operators P, Q as well as D1/2 and D−1/2 where D is the harmonic oscillator.

The mth order symbols Sm are given by smooth functions a satisfying

for all α and Ψm consists of all operators ψ(a) for such a.

If a is in  Sm and χ is a smooth function of compact support equal to 1 near 0, then

with T and S as above.

These operators preserve the Schwartz functions and satisfy;

The operators P and Q lie in  Ψ1 and D lies in Ψ2.

Properties:

A zeroth order symbol defines a bounded operator on L2(R).
D−1 lies in  Ψ−2
D1/2 lies in  Ψ1 and hence D−1/2 lies in Ψ−1, since D−1/2 = D1/2 ·D−1
Ψ−1 consists of compact operators, Ψ−s consists of trace-class operators for s > 1 and Ψk carries Hm into Hm–k.
 

then

So if F is supported in |z| ≤ R, then

The property of D−1 is proved by taking

with

Then R = I – DS lies in  Ψ−1, so that

lies in Ψ−2 and T = DA – I is smoothing. Hence

lies in   Ψ−2  since D−1 T is smoothing.

The property for D1/2 is established similarly by constructing B in Ψ1/2 with real symbol such that D – B4 is a smoothing operator. Using the holomorphic functional calculus it can be checked that D1/2 – B2 is a smoothing operator.

He showed that such operators can be expressed as integrals over the oscillator semigroup and then estimated using the Cotlar-Stein lemma.

Applications and generalizations

Theory for finite abelian groups
 noted that the formalism of the Stone–von Neumann theorem and the oscillator representation of the symplectic group extends from the real numbers R to any locally compact abelian group. A particularly simple example is provided by finite abelian groups, where the proofs are either elementary or simplifications of the proofs for R.

Let A be a finite abelian group, written additively, and let Q be a non-degenerate quadratic form on A with values in T. Thus

is a symmetric bilinear form on A that is non-degenerate, so permits an identification between A and its dual group A* = Hom (A, T).

Let  be the space of complex-valued functions on A with inner product

Define operators on V by

for x, y in A. Then U(x) and V(y) are unitary representations of A on V satisfying the commutation relations

This action is irreducible and is the unique such irreducible representation of these relations.

Let G = A × A and for z = (x, y) in G set

Then

where

a non-degenerate alternating bilinear form on G. The uniqueness result above implies that if W(z) is another family of unitaries giving a projective representation of G such that

then there is a unitary U, unique up to a phase, such that

for some λ(z) in T.

In particular if g is an automorphism of G preserving B, then there is an essentially unique unitary π(g) such that

The group of all such automorphisms is called the symplectic group for B and π gives a projective representation of G on V.

The group SL(2.Z) naturally acts on G = A x A by symplectic automorphisms. It is generated by the matrices

If Z = –I, then Z is central and

These automorphisms of G are implemented on V by the following operators:

It follows that

where μ lies in T. Direct calculation shows that μ is given by the Gauss sum

Transformation laws for theta functions

The metaplectic group was defined as the group

The coherent state

defines a holomorphic map of H into L2(R) satisfying

This is in fact a holomorphic map into each Sobolev space Hk and hence also .

In fact let m > 0 and set N = 2m. Let

The operators U(x), V(y) with x and y in M all commute and have a finite-dimensional subspace of fixed vectors formed by the distributions

with b in M1, where

Hence the group A = M1 acts on V0. This action can immediately be identified with the action on V for the N-dimensional oscillator representation associated with A, since

Since the operators π(R) and π(S) normalise the two sets of operators U and V corresponding to M and M1, it follows that they leave V0 invariant and on V0 must be constant multiples of the operators associated with the oscillator representation of A. In fact they coincide. From R this is immediate from the definitions, which show that

For S it follows from the Poisson summation formula and the commutation properties with the operators U)x) and V(y). The Poisson summation is proved classically as follows.

For a > 0 and f in  let

F is a smooth function on R with period a:

The theory of Fourier series shows that

 
with the sum absolutely convergent and the Fourier coefficients given by

Hence

the usual Poisson summation formula.

This formula shows that S acts as follows

and so agrees exactly with formula for the oscillator representation on A.

Identifying A with Z/2mZ, with

assigned to an integer n modulo 2m, the theta functions can be defined directly as matrix coefficients:

For τ in H and z in C set

so that |q| < 1. The theta functions agree with the standard classical formulas for the Jacobi-Riemann theta functions:

By definition they define holomorphic functions on H × C. The covariance properties of the function fτ and the distribution Ψb lead immediately to the following transformation laws:

Derivation of law of quadratic reciprocity
Because the operators π(S), π (R) and π(J) on L2(R) restrict to the corresponding operators on V0 for any choice of m, signs of cocycles can be determined by taking m = 1. In this case the representation is 2-dimensional and the relation

on L2(R) can be checked directly on V0.

But in this case

The relation can also be checked directly by applying both sides to the ground state exp -x2/2.

Consequently, it follows that for m ≥ 1 the Gauss sum can be evaluated:

For m  odd, define

If m is odd, then, splitting the previous sum up into two parts, it follows that G(1,m) equals m1/2 if m is congruent to 1 mod 4 and equals i m1/2 otherwise. If p is an odd prime and c is not divisible by p, this implies

where  is the Legendre symbol equal to 1 if c is a square mod p and –1 otherwise. Moreover, if p and q are distinct odd primes, then

From the formula for G(1,p) and this relation, the law of quadratic reciprocity follows:

Theory in higher dimensions
The theory of the oscillator representation can be extended from R to Rn with the group SL(2,R) replaced by the symplectic group Sp(2n,R).

Let  be the space of Schwartz functions on Rn, a dense subspace of L2(Rn).

From the definition U and V satisfy the Weyl commutation relation

As before this is called the Schrödinger representation.

The Fourier inversion formula

shows that the Fourier transform is an isomorphism of  onto itself extending to a unitary mapping of L2(Rn) onto itself (Plancherel's theorem).

The Stone–von Neumann theorem asserts that the Schrödinger representation is irreducible and is the unique irreducible representation of the commutation relations: any other representation is a direct sum of copies of this representation.

If U and V satisfying the Weyl commutation relations, define

Then

so that W defines a projective unitary representation of R2n with cocycle given by

where  and B is the symplectic form on R2n given by

The symplectic group Sp (2n,R) is defined to be group of automorphisms g of R2n preserving the form B. It follows from the Stone–von Neumann theorem that for each such g there is a unitary π(g) on L2(R) satisfying the covariance relation

By Schur's lemma the unitary π(g) is unique up to multiplication by a scalar ζ with |ζ| = 1, so that π defines a projective unitary representation of Sp(n). Representatives can be chosen for π(g), unique up to a sign, which show that the 2-cocycle for the projective representation of Sp(2n,R) takes values ±1. In fact elements of the group Sp(n,R) are given by 2n × 2n real matrices g satisfying

where

 
Sp(2n,R) is generated by matrices of the form

 
and the operators

satisfy the covariance relations above. This gives an ordinary unitary representation of the metaplectic group, a double cover of Sp(2n,R). Indeed, Sp(n,R) acts by Möbius transformations on the generalised Siegel upper half plane Hn consisting of symmetric complex n × n matrices Z with strictly imaginary part by

if

The function

satisfies the 1-cocycle relation

The metaplectic group Mp(2n,R) is defined as the group

and is a connected double covering group of Sp(2n,R).

If , then it defines a coherent state

in L2, lying in a single orbit of Sp(2n) generated by

If g lies in Mp(2n,R) then

defines an ordinary unitary representation of the metaplectic group, from which it follows that the cocycle on Sp(2n,R) takes only values ±1.

Holomorphic Fock space is the Hilbert space  of holomorphic functions f(z) on Cn with finite norm

 
inner product
 

and orthonormal basis

for α a multinomial.

define an irreducible unitary representation of the Weyl commutation relations. By the Stone–von Neumann theorem there is a unitary operator  from L2(Rn) onto  intertwining the two representations. It is given by the Bargmann transform

where

Its adjoint  is given by the formula:

Sobolev spaces, smooth and analytic vectors can be defined as in the one-dimensional case using the sum of n copies of the harmonic oscillator

The Weyl calculus similarly extends to the n-dimensional case.

The complexification Sp(2n,C) of the symplectic group is defined by the same relation, but allowing the matrices A, B, C and D to be complex. The subsemigroup of group elements that take the Siegel upper half plane into itself has a natural double cover. The representations of Mp(2n,R) on L2(Rn) and  extend naturally to a representation of this semigroup by contraction operators defined by kernels, which generalise the one-dimensional case (taking determinants where necessary). The action of Mp(2n,R) on coherent states applies equally well to operators in this larger semigroup.

As in the 1-dimensional case, where the group SL(2,R) has a counterpart SU(1,1) through the Cayley transform with the upper half plane replaced by the unit disc, the symplectic group has a complex counterpart. Indeed, if C is the unitary matrix

then C Sp(2n) C−1 is the group of all matrices

such that

or equivalently

where

The Siegel generalized disk Dn is defined as the set of complex symmetric n x n matrices W with operator norm less than 1.

It consist precisely of Cayley transforms of points Z in the Siegel generalized upper half plane:

Elements g act on Dn

and, as in the one dimensional case this action is transitive. The stabilizer subgroup of 0 consists of matrices with A unitary and B = 0.

For W in Dn the metaplectic coherent states in holomorphic Fock space are defined by

The inner product of two such states is given by

Moreover, the metaplectic representation π satisfies

The closed linear span of these states gives the even part of holomorphic Fock space . The embedding of Sp(2n) in Sp(2(n+1)) and the compatible identification

It can be verified directly that it is compatible with the action of the operators W(z).

Since the complex semigroup has as Shilov boundary the symplectic group, the fact that this representation has a well-defined contractive extension to the semigroup follows from the maximum modulus principle and the fact that the semigroup operators are closed under adjoints. Indeed, it suffices to check, for two such operators S, T and vectors vi proportional to metaplectic coherent states, that

which follows because the sum depends holomorphically on S and T, which are unitary on the boundary.

Index theorems for Toeplitz operators
Let S denote the unit sphere in Cn and define the Hardy space H2(S) be the closure in L2(S) of the restriction of polynomials in the coordinates z1, ..., zn. Let P be the projection onto Hardy space. It is known that if m(f) denotes multiplication by a continuous function f on S, then the commutator [P,m(f)] is compact. Consequently, defining the Toeplitz operator by

on Hardy space, it follows that T(fg) – T(f)T(g) is compact for continuous f and g. The same holds if f and g are matrix-valued functions (so that the corresponding Toeplitz operators are matrices of operators on H2(S)). In particular if f is a function on S taking values in invertible matrices, then

are compact and hence T(f) is a Fredholm operator with an index defined as

 gave an analytic way to establish this index theorem, simplied later by Howe. Their proof relies on the fact if f is smooth then the index is given by the formula of McKean and Singer:

 noticed that there was a natural unitary isomorphism between H2(S) and L2(Rn) carrying the Toeplitz operators

onto the operators

These are examples of zeroth order operators constructed within the Weyl calculus. The traces in the McKean-Singer formula can be computed directly using the Weyl calculus, leading to another proof of the index theorem. This method of proving index theorems was generalised by Alain Connes within the framework of cyclic cohomology.

Theory in infinite dimensions
The theory of the oscillator representation in infinite dimensions is due to Irving Segal and David Shale. Graeme Segal used it to give a mathematically rigorous construction of projective representations of loop groups and the group of diffeomorphisms of the circle. At an infinitesimal level the construction of the representations of the Lie algebras, in this case the affine Kac–Moody algebra and the Virasoro algebra, was already known to physicists, through dual resonance theory and later string theory. Only the simplest case will be considered here, involving the loop group LU(1) of smooth maps of the circle into U(1) = T. The oscillator semigroup, developed independently by Neretin and Segal, allows contraction operators to be defined for the semigroup of univalent holomorphic maps of the unit disc into itself, extending the unitary operators corresponding to diffeomorphisms of the circle. When applied to the subgroup SU(1,1) of the diffeomorphism group, this gives a generalization of the oscillator representation on L2(R) and its extension to the Olshanskii semigroup.

The representation of commutation on Fock space is generalized to infinite dimensions by replacing Cn (or its dual space) by an arbitrary complex Hilbert space H. The symmetric group Sk acts on H⊗k. Sk(H) is defined to be the fixed point subspace of Sk and the symmetric algebra is the algebraic direct sum

It has a natural inner product inherited from H⊗k:

Taking the components Sk(H) to be mutually orthogonal, the symmetric Fock space S(H) is defined to be the Hilbert space completion of this direct sum.

For ξ in H define the coherent state eξ by

It follows that their linear span is dense in S(H), that the coherent states corresponding to n distinct vectors are linearly independent and that

When H is finite-dimensional, S(H) can naturally be identified with holomorphic Fock space for H*, since in the standard way Sk(H) are just homogeneous polynomials of degree k on H* and the inner products match up. Moreover, S(H) has functorial properties. Most importantly

A similar result hold for finite orthogonal direct sums and extends to infinite orthogonal direct sums, using von Neumman's definition of the infinite tensor product with 1 the reference unit vector in S0(Hi). Any contraction operator between Hilbert spaces induces a contraction operator between the corresponding symmetric Fock spaces in a functorial way.

A unitary operator on S(H) is uniquely determined by it values on coherent states. Moreover, for any assignment vξ such that

there is a unique unitary operator U on S(H) such that

As in the finite-dimensional case, this allows the unitary operators W(x) to be defined for x in H:

It follows immediately from the finite-dimensional case that these operators are unitary and satisfy

In particular the Weyl commutation relations are satisfied:

Taking an orthonormal basis en of H, S(H) can be written as an infinite tensor product of the S(C en). The irreducibility of W on each of these spaces implies the irreducibility of W on the whole of S(H). W is called the complex wave representation.
 
To define the symplectic group in infinite dimensions let HR be the underlying real vector space of H with the symplectic form

and real inner product

The complex structure is then defined by the orthogonal operator

 
so that

A bounded invertible operator real linear operator T on HR lies in the symplectic group if it and its inverse preserve B. This is equivalent to the conditions:

The operator T is said to be implementable on S(H) provided there is a unitary π(T) such that

The implementable operators form a subgroup of the symplectic group, the restricted symplectic group. By Schur's lemma, π(T) is uniquely determined up to a scalar in T, so π gives a projective unitary representation of this subgroup.

The Segal-Shale quantization criterion states that T is implementable, i.e. lies in the restricted symplectic group, if and only if the commutator TJ – JT is a Hilbert–Schmidt operator.

Unlike the finite-dimensional case where a lifting π could be chosen so that it was multiplicative up to a sign, this is not possible in the infinite-dimensional case. (This can be seen directly using the example of the projective representation of the diffeomorphism group of the circle constructed below.)

The projective representation of the restricted symplectic group can be constructed directly on coherent states as in the finite-dimensional case.

In fact, choosing a real Hilbert subspace of H of which H is a complexification, for any operator T on H a complex conjugate of T is also defined. Then the infinite-dimensional analogue of SU(1,1) consists of invertible bounded operators

satisfying gKg* = K (or equivalently the same relations as in the finite-dimensional case). These belong to the restricted symplectic group if and only if B is a Hilbert–Schmidt operator. This group acts transitively on the infinite-dimensional analogue D≈ of the Seigel generalized unit disk consisting of Hilbert–Schmidt operators W that are symmetric with operator norm less than 1 via the formula

Again the stabilizer subgroup of 0 consists of g with A unitary and B = 0. The metaplectic coherent states fW can be defined as before and their inner product is given by the same formula, using the Fredholm determinant:

Define unit vectors by

 
and set

where μ(ζ) = ζ/|ζ|. As before this defines a projective representation and, if g3 = g1g2, the cocycle is given by

This representation extends by analytic continuation to define contraction operators for the complex semigroup by the same analytic continuation argument as in the finite-dimensional case. It can also be shown that they are strict contractions.

Example Let HR be the real Hilbert space consisting of real-valued functions on the circle with mean 0

and for which

The inner product is given by

An orthogonal basis is given by the function sin(nθ) and cos(nθ) for n > 0. The Hilbert transform on the circle defined by

defines a complex structure on HR. J can also be written

where sign n = ±1 denotes the sign of n. The corresponding symplectic form is proportional to

In particular if φ is an orientation-preserving diffeomorphism of the circle and

then Tφ is implementable.

The operators W(f) with f smooth correspond to a subgroup of the loop group LT invariant under the diffeomorphism group of the circle. The infinitesimal operators corresponding to the vector fields

can be computed explicitly. They satisfy the Virasoro relations

In particular they cannor be adjusted by addition of scalar operators to remove the second term on the right hand side. This shows that the cocycle on the restricted symplectic group is not equivalent to one taking only the values ±1.

See also
Metaplectic group
Invariant convex cone

Notes

References
 

 

 

 

Operator theory
Harmonic analysis
Representation theory
Quantum mechanics
Theta functions